The 2018 Belarusian Premier League was the 28th season of top-tier football in Belarus. BATE Borisov were the defending champions, having won their 12th consecutive league title and 14th overall last year, and successfully defended their crown.

Teams

The bottom two teams from the 2017 season (Slavia Mozyr and Naftan Novopolotsk) were relegated to the 2018 Belarusian First League. They were replaced by Luch Minsk and Smolevichi, champions and runners-up of the 2017 Belarusian First League respectively. 

Before the start of the season, Krumkachy Minsk were excluded from the league, after repeatedly missing deadlines for providing necessary licensing documents and pay off the salary debts to the players. The decision was made final on 19 March. They were replaced by Torpedo Minsk (3rd placed team of 2017 Belarusian First League).

Source: Scoresway

League table

Results
Each team plays home-and-away once against every other team for a total of 30 matches played each.

Top goalscorers
Updated to games played on 2 December 2018 Source: football.by

See also
2018 Belarusian First League
2017–18 Belarusian Cup
2018–19 Belarusian Cup

References

External links
 

2018
Belarus
Belarus
1